Labeo falcipinnis is fish in genus Labeo from the Congo River.

References 

Labeo
Fish described in 1903
Endemic fauna of the Democratic Republic of the Congo